Sclerolaena tricuspis (syn. Bassia tricuspis), the giant redburr or three-spined Bassia, is a species of flowering plant in the family Amaranthaceae, native to eastern Australia. A shrub reaching , it has slender terete leaves.

References

tricuspis
Endemic flora of Australia
Flora of South Australia
Flora of Queensland
Flora of New South Wales
Flora of Victoria (Australia)
Taxa named by Ferdinand von Mueller
Plants described in 1934